Lost City (formerly Stone City and Stone Creek Settlement) is an unincorporated community in Calaveras County, California,  from Angels Camp along Bear Creek. It lies at an elevation of 1053 feet (321 m). Lost City was constructed in the 1870s by Eugene Barbe. It consists of roughly one dozen stone buildings, which may have been an early Icarian commune (followers of the utopian socialist ideals of Etienne Cabet). The settlement was abandoned by 1896, though a few walls of the original dry-laid field stone buildings remain. The ruins are currently on private land.

References

Further reading

Former settlements in Calaveras County, California
Utopian communities in California
Ghost towns in California